James Annand (1843 – 6 February 1906) was a Scottish journalist, newspaper editor and Liberal Party politician.

Born at Longside, Aberdeenshire, Scotland, the eldest son of blacksmith Robert Annand and his wife Margaret Moir, James Annand began his working life following in his father's trade as a blacksmith in Longside.  He bought a share of the Buchan Observer and became its editor for about six years. Thereafter, he edited several newspapers in North East England:  from 1874 to 1877 he edited the Newcastle Daily Chronicle, from 1877 to 1885 the South Shields Gazette, and finally from 1885 to 1895 was editor of the Northern Weekly Leader. After an unsuccessful bid for a parliamentary seat in Tynemouth in 1892, he was elected at the general election in January 1906 as the Member of Parliament (MP) for East Aberdeenshire. He died in London sixteen days later, before he had an opportunity to take his seat, thus becoming one of the shortest-serving MPs in history.

His brother, Robert Cumming Annand, was also involved in the newspaper industry.

James Annand was briefly married to Mary Hannah Burt in 1899 until her death in 1900.

See also
List of United Kingdom MPs with the shortest service

References

Sources 
Hodgson, George B. From smithy to senate: The life story of James Annand, journalist and politician. London: Cassell, 1908.

External links 
 

1843 births
1906 deaths
British newspaper editors
Members of the Parliament of the United Kingdom for Scottish constituencies
Scottish Liberal Party MPs
UK MPs 1906–1910
Elected officials who died without taking their seats